Eddie Laycock (born 25 May 1961) is a former professional motorcycle racer from Dublin, Ireland.

Motorcycle racing career
A two-time Isle of Man TT race winner, in 1986, Laycock finished runner-up to Brian Reid in the TT Formula 2 World Championship. In 1987 he beat Reid to win the Junior TT 250cc race, and in 1989 won the Supersport 400cc Race. He also competed in the 500cc World Championship on Millar Racing machines from 1988 to 1992, with a best race result of 9th at the Dutch TT in 1992, and a best championship ranking of 12th in 1991.

In 2015, Laycock and former sponsor Gerry Lawlor prepared a Yamaha TZ250 for Ian Lougher to ride in the Lightweight class at the Isle of Man Classic TT .

Career statistics

Complete TT record

Races by year 
(key)

North West 200 Record : 4 Victories

Races by year

Ulster Grand Prix Record : 5 Victories

Races by year

TT Formula 2 World Championship

Races by year 
(key)

Grand Prix motorcycle racing

Races by year 
(key) (Races in bold indicate pole position) (Races in italics indicate fastest lap)

External links 

 Official MotoGP website Eddie Laycock profile
Isle of Man TT Competitor Profile
1986 TT Formula 2 World Championship Results

References 

Living people
Sportspeople from Dublin (city)
Irish motorcycle racers
500cc World Championship riders
Isle of Man TT riders
1961 births